Albert "Al" Sorensen (born February 19, 1932) served as a Democratic Iowa State Senator from 1991 to 1997.  He joined the Senate after winning a special election in 1991, his predecessor, Jack Nystrom (R-Boone), having resigned to serve on the Iowa Liquor Commission.  He won re-election in 1992, but lost in 1996 to Republican Jerry Behn.

During his second term in the Senate, Sorensen served on several committees in the Iowa Senate - the Agriculture committee; the Natural Resources, Environment and Energy committee; the Small Business, Economic Development & Tourism committee; the State Government committee; and the Local Government committee, where he was the chair.

Sorensen was elected to the Boone County Board of Supervisors in 2000 and re-elected in 2004.  He was nominated to be the Democratic candidate for the 24th Senate District, challenging Republican incumbent Jerry Behn in the 2008 general election.

References

External links

Boone County Board of Supervisors profile
Iowa General Assembly - Senator Albert Sorensen - 1996 official Senate website
Project Vote Smart - Albert Sorensen profile (Senate candidate)
Project Vote Smart - Albert Sorensen profile (County Supervisor; incomplete)

Democratic Party Iowa state senators
1932 births
Living people
Members of the Evangelical Free Church of America
County supervisors in Iowa
People from Boone, Iowa